Rugby league is a popular team sport played in Fiji since 1992.

History

Joe Levula and Orisi Dawai were the first Fijians to play rugby league after they were recruited to play professionally for the Rochdale Hornets in 1961. Voate Driu and Laitia Ravouvou joined the club the next year, with numerous others following throughout the 1960s and 1970s. These players largely remained in Rochdale after their careers.

In 1992, a number of high-profile Fijian rugby union representatives converted to rugby league and entered the Rugby League World Sevens, for which they received lifetime bans from the Fiji Rugby Union. Under the guidance of Bob Abbott (from the Australian Rugby League), a six-team rugby league competition was established in Fiji later that same year. The competition used match payments to attract players from rugby union, with FJ$40 (AU$38) offered per win and FJ$10 per loss. The sport was supported by Sitiveni Rabuka, who served as President of the Fiji Rugby League (FRL) during that period.

The FRL aligned itself with the News Corp-backed Super League during the Super League war. Suva hosted the inaugural Super League World Nines in February 1996, which reportedly brought $1.3 million into the local economy. Under the Super League, the FRL grew from eight clubs with one team each to twelve clubs with two teams each. Abbott and the Australian Rugby League had meanwhile established a small competition in western Fiji.

2001 was the last year in which payments were offered to rugby league players in Fiji.

The first women's club rugby league match in the country was played on 26 March 2016, between Bemana and the Coastal Roos.

In 2020, the Kaiviti Silktails entered the NSWRL's third tier Ron Massey Cup, with entry to the second tier New South Wales Cup guaranteed for 2021. However, due to the COVID-19 pandemic, the plans were delayed by one year. The team draws its players from Fiji's local competition.

Domestic Competitions

Teams in Australian Competitions

Ron Massey Cup

Vodafone Cup
The Fiji National Rugby League runs the national domestic rugby league competition in Fiji. Known as the Vodafone Cup, the competition features 32 teams across two conferences, each with two zones. The competition was formed in 1998, and has been Fiji's top level rugby league competition ever since.

Teams 

The FNRL Vodafone Cup is the top club competition for men's rugby league in Fiji.

It was previously divided into two conferences (East and West). The number of conferences has increased as the competition has grown.

24 teams took part in the 2020 Vodafone Cup. The 2022 season featured 30 teams.

Premiers 

An * indicates that the match was decided in extra time.

Inter-Zone Championship
The Inter-Zone Championship was created in 2016. The teams were made up of the strongest players from the Vodafone Cup. The men's and U20's competition was first held in 2016, while the women's competition was introduced in 2017.

Each Zone plays each other over 5 weeks before semi finals and a final is played.

Melanesian Club Championship
The Melanesian Club Championship has been contested by the Fijian champions (at either club or zone level) and the winner of Papua New Guinea's Digicel Cup since 2015.

Media coverage
As early as 1993, one Winfield Cup match was being broadcast on Fijian television per week.

In 2016, the Fiji Times partnered with the FNRL to become the official newspaper of rugby league in the country.

Beginning in 2018, two NRL matches are broadcast live on free-to-air television each weekend by FBC TV.

National teams

The men's national team, known as the Bati, was formed in 1992 and have competed at 5 Rugby League World Cups (1995, 2000, 2008, 2013, and 2017). They achieved their best result as semi-finalists on three occasions, in 2008, 2013, and 2017.

The women's national team, known as the Bulikula, was reformed in 2018 and played a full international against  the following year.

Notable players
 Sisa Waqa (Nadera Panthers)
 Semi Radradra
 Maika Sivo
 Apisai Koroisau
 Petero Civoniceva
 Viliame Kikau

See also

Fiji National Rugby League
Fiji National Rugby League competition

References

External links
 Fiji history from playtheball.com